The Beautiful Galatea is a 1950 West German romantic comedy film directed by Rolf Meyer and starring Hannelore Schroth, Viktor de Kowa and Willy Fritsch. It is inspired by the story of Pygmalion's statue Galatea and is based on the play of the same name by Franz von Suppè.

It was shot at the Bendestorf Studios and the Tempelhof Studios in Berlin. The film's sets were designed by Franz Schroedter.

Plot
During the first 18 years of the 20th century, in a small town, two men, the sculptor Viktor Kolin and the Kapellmeister Marcel Thomas work on the Galathée theme, each in his own way. While one tries to approach the Galathée in a musical way, the other plans to carton the nymph in stone. Viktor has already chosen a young woman to model for the statue: it is the young Leni, a simple girl from the people who works as a temp at the vegetable market.

Leni feels very flattered and promptly falls in love with Viktor, making her a competitor of the singer Victoria Mertens, the sculptor's girlfriend. Viktor on the other hand, also shows interest in Victoria, which gives the erotic round additional piquancy. Upon completing his masterpiece, Marcel suddenly loses interest in Leni, who had hoped that the sculpture would attract him more to her. Full of anger, she goes to his studio and smashes the artwork. A court case is scheduled, and only then does Viktor realizes Leni's true feelings. Following the court order, he no longer opposes Victoria's decision to marry Kapellmeister Thomas.

Cast
Hannelore Schroth as Leni Fink
Viktor de Kowa as Viktor Kolin
Willy Fritsch as Marcel Thomas
Gisela Schmidting as Victoria Mertens
Margarete Haagen as Anastasia
Erna Sellmer
Hans Schwarz Jr.
Ernst Waldow
Edda Seippel
Franz Schafheitlin
Werner Stock
Albert Florath

References

External links

1950 romantic comedy films
1950s historical comedy films
German romantic comedy films
West German films
Films directed by Rolf Meyer
German historical romance films
Films about fictional painters
Films set in the 1900s
German black-and-white films
Films shot at Tempelhof Studios
1950s German films